Cronus Glacier is a glacier  long and  wide flowing northwest into Bowman Inlet between the Calypso Cliffs and Crabeater Point on the east coast of the Antarctic Peninsula. It was photographed by the Ronne Antarctic Research Expedition (trimetrogon air photography) on December 22, 1947, and roughly surveyed by the Falkland Islands Dependencies Survey in December 1958. It was named by the UK Antarctic Place-Names Committee after Cronus, the god of agriculture in Greek mythology.

References 

Glaciers of Graham Land
Bowman Coast